Matt and Bubba Kadane is an American musical duo that consists of two brothers, Matt Kadane and Bubba Kadane. They have founded three indie rock bands, serving as producers, songwriters, vocalists, and guitarists in all of them. The first, Bedhead, released three well-received studio LPs before it was disbanded. The brothers reformed as The New Year in 2001, and in 2012 they formed the group Overseas with David Bazan and Will Johnson.

Discography

Albums with Bedhead

1994: WhatFunLifeWas (Trance Syndicate)
1994: 4-songEP19:10 (Trance Syndicate)
1996: The Dark Ages EP (Trance Syndicate)
1996: Beheaded (Trance Syndicate)
1998: Transaction de Novo (Trance Syndicate)
2000: Macha Loved Bedhead (Jetset Records)
2014: 1992-1998 Box Set
2015: Live 1998 live album (Numero Group)

Singles
1992: "Bedside Table/Living Well"  (Direct Hit Records)
1993: "The Rest of the Day/I'm Not Here"  (Direct Hit Records)
1998: "Lepidoptera/Leper"  (Trance Syndicate)

Albums with The New Year

2001: Newness Ends   (Touch & Go)
2004: The End Is Near  (Touch & Go)
2008: The New Year  (Touch & Go)
2017: Snow (Undertow Music Collective)

Albums with Overseas

2013: Overseas

Soundtracks
2004: Music from the Film Hell House (Plexifilm)

Performance/production credits

Further reading
Interviews
Interview with Matt Kadane (Deathrockstar, July 2003)
Bubba Kadane Interview (Bandega.com, 2007)

References

External links
Bubba Kadane's official site

American musical duos
Rock music groups from Texas
Rock music duos
Overseas (band) members